Elburgon is a small town in Nakuru County, Kenya. It is located 30 kilometres west of the capital city of Nakuru, the provincial capital. Nearest towns include Molo, Njoro and Rongai.

Elburgon is an electoral ward of the Molo Constituency and Nakuru County Council. Elburgon is also a name of an administrative division in Nakuru County. Elburgon division is divided into three locations: Elburgon, Mariashoni and Turi.

Transport 
It is served by a station on the branch railway to Kisumu.

See also 
 Railway stations in Kenya

Lumbering
Apart from agriculture the lumbering industry serves as a key economic activity in the town. The timber industry serves as a key employer in the town. Lumbering companies such as Timsales ltd and CHEKIMU WOODMART are just a few of the logging and sawmilling factories that harvest timber in the highland region of Nakuru and beyond.

References

External links 
 Elburgon Town

Populated places in Nakuru County